Nancy Barbara Bond (born 1945) is an American author of children's literature. In 1977 her first book, A String in the Harp, was fantasy novel with an element of folklore, set in West Wales. It received a Newbery honor and the Welsh Tir na n-Og Award, and remains in print.

Life
Nancy Barbara Bond was born January 8, 1945, in Bethesda, Maryland, and grew up near Concord, Massachusetts. When Bond was eight, the family spent a year in London while her father was on a Fulbright Scholarship. She graduated from high school in Concord, then received her B. A. in English literature from Mount Holyoke College in 1966. In 1972 she received a graduate degree from the College of Librarianship in Aberystwyth, Wales.

Bond's "three greatest interests as long as she can remember have been natural history, books – especially children's books – and Britain."

Bond worked in Boston for Houghton Mifflin publishing from 1966 to 1967, then for two years in London in the promotions department of Oxford University Press. She went on to be an assistant librarian for the Lincoln, Massachusetts Public Library from 1969 to 1971. On returning from her year in Wales, Bond was looking for a job and began to write her first book, which she set in Wales. She became head librarian in the Gardner, Massachusetts, library in 1973.

Bond's children's novel A String in the Harp appeared in 1976. Set mainly in Borth, near Aberystwyth, where Bond had attended college, it tells the story of an American family spending a year in Wales after the death of their mother. As Bond put it to an interviewer, "Each of my stories is tied firmly to a geographical setting, which plays an important part in the development of the book." She served as an administrative assistant in the Massachusetts Audubon Society from 1976 to 1977. Her second book, The Best of Enemies, followed in 1978. From 1979 to 2001 Bond taught at the Simmons College Center for the Study of Children's Literature. Since then she has worked as a bookseller and continued as a writer in Concord.

Critical reception
'The String in the Harp was named a Newbery Honor Book, and a Boston Globe-Horn Book Honor Book in 1977. It received the International Reading Association Award and the Welsh Arts Council's Tir na n-Og for the best English-language children's book about Wales, which called it "a most impressive first novel [in which] Bond deftly blends fantasy and realism...." The University of Chicago Guide to Children's Literature also praised the characters' growing maturity throughout the story. It has been several times reissued and remains in print.

Her fourth book, The Voyage Begun, won the Boston Globe-Horn Book Award. Her fifth, A Place to Come Back To, was named an ALA Best Books for Young Adults, and the Booklist Editor's Choice.

Selected works
A String in the Harp, Atheneum (New York, NY) 1976
The Best of Enemies, Atheneum (New York, NY) 1978
Country of Broken Stone, Atheneum (New York, NY) 1980
The Voyage Begun, Atheneum (New York, NY) 1981
A Place to Come Back To, Atheneum (New York, NY) 1984
Another Shore, Macmillan (New York, NY) 1988
Truth To Tell, McElderry Books (New York, NY) 1994
The Love of Friends, McElderry Books (New York, NY) 1997

References

External links
Nancy Bond papers 
Interview

1945 births
Living people
20th-century American novelists
21st-century American novelists
20th-century American women writers
Women science fiction and fantasy writers
American women novelists
American women children's writers
American children's writers
American fantasy writers
Newbery Honor winners
People from Bethesda, Maryland
People from Concord, Massachusetts
Novelists from Maryland
Novelists from Massachusetts
Mount Holyoke College alumni
21st-century American women writers